Magnus Davidsohn ( – ) was chief cantor of the Fasanenstrasse synagogue from its opening in 1912 until its closing by the Nazis in 1936. A trained opera singer, he played the part of King Heinrich in Gustav Mahler's 1899 production of Lohengrin. After leaving Berlin in 1939, he helped found Belsize Square Synagogue in London. He died in Düsseldorf, West Germany, in 1958.

Davidsohn and his wife were close friends with the parents of Ernst vom Rath, whose assassination in Paris precipitated Kristallnacht. Directly after vom Rath's murder, Davidsohn and his wife visited the parents of vom Rath, who assured him that they did not blame the Jews of Germany (Anthony Grenville: 'Listening to Refugee Voices: The Association of Jewish Refugees Information and Research on the Refugees from Hitler in Britain', in Refugees from the Third Reich in Britain, Yearbook of the Research Centre for German and Austrian Exile Studies, volume 4).

Magnus Davidsohn's daughter, Ilse Stanley, saved hundreds of Jews from concentration camps, and was the author of the book The Unforgotten (Beacon Press, 1957), a memoir of Weimar Germany and the Nazi years. She was also featured on an episode of the American television program This Is Your Life, where she was reunited with her father.

Notes 

Hazzans
German opera singers
German Orthodox Jews
German emigrants to England
Jewish emigrants from Nazi Germany to the United Kingdom
People from Bytom
1958 deaths
1877 births